Events in the year 1883 in Portugal.

Incumbents
Monarch: Louis I
Prime Minister: de Melo

Events

Arts and entertainment

Sports

Births

5 April – Carlos Sampaio Garrido, diplomat (died 1960)
19 August – José Mendes Cabeçadas, military officer and politician (died 1965)
30 December (in Portuguese colony Macau) – João Tamagnini Barbosa, military officer and politician (died in 1948)
Gil de Andrade, fencer.
Manuel Queiróz, fencer.

Deaths
26 February – Miguel Ângelo Lupi, painter (born 1826)

References

 
1880s in Portugal
Years of the 19th century in Portugal
Portugal